The Deer's Bell is a 1982 Chinese animated film produced by Shanghai Animation Film Studio. It is also referred to as Bell on a Deer and Lu Ling.

Plot
An old man and his granddaughter rescue an injured young deer. The girl and the young deer develop a close relationship. After the recovery, the deer returns to the wild. Feeling sad, the girl puts a bell on the deer. Disappearing into the mountain valley, the deer's bell continues to echo.

Awards
 The film won best animation in the 1983 Golden Rooster Awards. 
 Awarded the best fine arts piece prize in 1983 by China's Ministry of Culture.
 Won the outstanding movie prize at the 13th Moscow International Film Festival animated cartoon special prize in 1982.

References

External links

 The film at China's Movie Database

1982 animated films
1982 films
1980s animated short films
Chinese animated short films
1980s Mandarin-language films